Janet Pitsiulaaq Brewster (born 1969 or 1970) is a Canadian Inuk politician, who was elected to the Legislative Assembly of Nunavut in the 2021 Nunavut general election. She represents the electoral district of Iqaluit-Sinaa.

Prior to her election to the legislature, Brewster served on Iqaluit City Council, including a stint as deputy mayor of the city.

On June 2, 2022, during members' statements, Brewster came out as LGBTQ in a statement celebrating the legislature's decision to raise a pride flag for the first time, becoming the territory's first known LGBTQ holder of political office.

References

Living people
Members of the Legislative Assembly of Nunavut
Women MLAs in Nunavut
Inuit politicians
21st-century Canadian politicians
21st-century Canadian women politicians
Inuit from Nunavut
Iqaluit city councillors
LGBT municipal councillors in Canada
Canadian LGBT people in provincial and territorial legislatures
Year of birth missing (living people)
21st-century Canadian LGBT people